Sorbia may refer to:
 Lusatia, a region split between Germany and Poland
 Sorbia (beetle), a genus of beetles

See also 
 Sorbian (disambiguation)
 Serbia (disambiguation)